Parliamentary elections were held in Bulgaria in the autumn of 1882. These were the first elections since the suspension of the constitution by the Second Grand National Assembly on 13 July 1881. As part of the amendments adopted by the GNA, the number of representatives was brought down from 307 to 47, the lowest in Bulgarian history. The Liberal Party boycotted the poll in protest over last year's election campaign. This resulted in another conservative majority. The assembly convened on 10 December 1882. Unlike last time, the conservatives showed a surprising degree of independence, that was shown primarily against the Russians. Disagreements over foreign and domestic policies (such as railway construction) led prince Alexander I and the Assembly to stand against Russian influence and restore the constitution on 6 September 1883. This prompted the departure of Russian generals Leonid Sobolev and Alexander Kaulbars and then the forming of a coalition government between Liberals and Conservatives chaired by Dragan Tsankov.

References

Bulgaria
1882 in Bulgaria
Parliamentary elections in Bulgaria